Bidirectional may refer to:

 Bidirectional, a roadway that carries traffic moving in opposite directions
 Bi-directional vehicle, a tram or train or any other vehicle that can be controlled from either end and can move forward or backward with equal ease without any need to be turned around
 Bidirectional text, text containing text in both text directionalities
 Duplex (telecommunications), communication in both directions
 Bidirectionalization, a process in computer science
 Bidirectional railway signalling; see Application of railway signals#Bidirectional signalling
 Bidirectional learning/process refers to two way learning. In terms of socialization, the process helps both novices and experts learn from each other. 
 Bidirectional LED